The World Trade Centre is a complex of eight buildings under construction in the Central Business District of Abuja, FCT in Nigeria. There are seven skyscrapers planned for the site, two of which have already been topped out, with the others either under construction or at various stages of development. Initially scheduled to be opened in 2013, the World Trade Centre Abuja is now scheduled to open in 2016.

The complex is being funded by private financial institutions, as well as private investors, costing about ₦200 billion. it is being developed by First Intercontinental Properties Limited, a subsidiary of The churchgate Group, a Nigerian real estate company, and the project was designed by Woods Bagot, WSP Consulting is the structural consultant, whilst Abuja Investments Company is also a partner. The WTC Abuja, when completed, will be the largest mixed-use development on the West African subcontinent.

Development
The development of World Trade Centre Abuja started in 2010, on a land size of over 6,000 hectares in the Central Business District of Abuja. The project was initially on a much lesser scale; at the conceptual stage of the project, two unsuccessful attempts were made at securing development partners before First Continental Properties Limited was secured in 2009 through a bid process which eventually led to a development-lease agreement with Abuja Investments Company Limited (ACIL). Along the line, the scope of the project was later expanded to a mega-multi-use complex, "which would be bustling throughout the day and night".

President Goodluck Jonathan broke ground for the project in September 2011, with an estimated completion and opening date initially scheduled for 2013. However, the date could not be kept due to several challenges in design, development and even during construction process of the project. The project has also undergone several redesign in order to meet the changing "market demands".

The complex is being funded by private financial institutions, as well as private investors, costing about ₦200 billion. it is being developed by The churchgate Group, a Nigerian real estate company, with Woods Bagot as the architect. Other partners and consultants of the project include: Abuja Investments Company who is a partner, WSP Consulting is the structural consultant, Edifice Consultants PVT Limited is the executive architect, as well as MEP Consultant. Others are: Messrs Hancock Ogundiya & Partners, Local MEP & C&S Consultants, while Space Designers Limited is the Local Architectural Consultant.

Architecture and design
The glass cladding and aluminum ceilings used for the buildings in World Trade Centre are heat-resistant, sound-proof and also are not flammable. The buildings employ VRV air conditioning systems. The centre also has an advanced CCTV security and employs a controlled Card access in all areas. There are three levels of basement parking in the complex. The curtain wall system employed by the building was installed by Eurotech Facades.

Structures
Six towers, a mall, and a hotel are to eventually occupy the World Trade Centre Abuja; As of 2015, towers 1 and 2 have been topped out, whilst the other buildings are in different stages of development.

World Trade Centre Tower 1
The tower contains 120 apartments, which  range in size from 1 to 6 bedrooms, with Duplex options and two exquisite Penthouses and Pool Villas. Tower 1 topped out in 2015, becoming the tallest residential building in Nigeria.

World Trade Centre Tower 2
Office options in this tower ranges from 130 square metres to 1,440 square metres. It topped out in 2015, to become the tallest building in Abuja.

Capital Mall
Capital Mall, or Capital City Mall, is scheduled to begin operations in late 2016. It is estimated to have a capacity of about 40,000 square metres, on two levels.

World Trade Centre - The Hotel
The hotel is scheduled to begin construction in 2016/2017. It will be a 5-star 38-storey branded hotel, managed by Grand Hyatt. The number of floors has also been published to be at least 45 floors.

2014 Crane collapse
In November 2014, one of the construction cranes for WTC Tower 2 buckled after a prolonged heavy rainfall, damaging a substantial area of the glass cladding as a result. It was deduced that the crane fell due to impact of thunder storm. No casualty was recorded, as the incident took place when there was no work going on in the building, however, the damage affected the completion date of the project, which had been scheduled for June 2015.

See also
List of tallest buildings in Nigeria
List of World Trade Centers

notes

References

External links

Buildings and structures in Abuja
Skyscrapers in Nigeria
High-tech architecture
Residential buildings completed in 2016
Office buildings completed in 2016
Skyscraper office buildings
Residential skyscrapers
Buildings and structures under construction in Nigeria
Economy of Abuja
2016 establishments in Nigeria
21st-century architecture in Nigeria